The Eleventh Canadian Ministry was the first cabinet chaired by Prime Minister Arthur Meighen.  It governed Canada from 10 July 1920 to 29 December 1921, including only the last year of the 13th Canadian Parliament.  The government was formed by the National Liberal and Conservative Party.  Meighen was also Prime Minister in the Thirteenth Canadian Ministry.

Ministers
Prime Minister
10 July 1920 – 29 December 1921: Arthur Meighen
Minister of Agriculture
10 July 1920 – 29 December 1921: Simon Fraser Tolmie
Minister of Customs and Excise
4 June 1921 – 21 September 1921: Rupert Wilson Wigmore
21 September 1921 – 29 December 1921: John Babington Macaulay Baxter
Minister of Customs and Inland Revenue
10 July 1920 – 13 July 1920: Martin Burrell
13 July 1920 – 4 June 1921: Rupert Wilson Wigmore
Secretary of State for External Affairs
10 July 1920 – 29 December 1921: Arthur Meighen
Minister of Finance
10 July 1920 – 29 December 1921: Sir Henry Lumley Drayton
Receiver General of Canada
10 July 1920 – 29 December 1921: The Minister of Finance (Ex officio)
10 July 1920 – 29 December 1921: Sir Henry Lumley Drayton
Minister presiding over the Department of Health
10 July 1920 – 21 September 1921: James Alexander Calder
21 September 1921 – 29 December 1921: John Wesley Edwards
Minister of Immigration and Colonization
10 July 1920 – 21 September 1921: James Alexander Calder
21 September 1921 – 29 December 1921: John Wesley Edwards
Superintendent-General of Indian Affairs
10 July 1920 – 29 December 1921: The Minister of the Interior (Ex officio)
10 July 1920 – 29 December 1921: Sir James Alexander Lougheed
Minister of the Interior
10 July 1920 – 29 December 1921: Sir James Alexander Lougheed
Minister of Justice 
10 July 1920 – 4 October 1921: Charles Doherty
4 October 1921 – 29 December 1921: R. B. Bennett
Attorney General of Canada
10 July 1920 – 29 December 1921: The Minister of Justice (Ex officio)
10 July 1920 – 21 September 1921: Charles Doherty
4 October 1921 – 29 December 1921: R. B. Bennett
Minister of Labour
10 July 1920 – 29 December 1921: Gideon Robertson
Leader of the Government in the Senate
10 July 1920 – 29 December 1921: James Alexander Lougheed
Minister of Marine and Fisheries
10 July 1920 – 29 December 1921: Charles Ballantyne
Minister of Militia and Defence 
10 July 1920 – 29 December 1921: Hugh Guthrie
Minister of Mines
10 July 1920 – 29 December 1921: Sir James Alexander Lougheed
Minister of the Naval Service
10 July 1920 – 29 December 1921: Charles Ballantyne
Postmaster General
10 July 1920 – 21 September 1921: Pierre-Édouard Blondin
21 September 1921 – 29 December 1921: Louis de Gonzague Belley
President of the Privy Council
10 July 1920 – 21 September 1921: James Alexander Calder
21 September 1921 – 29 December 1921: Louis-Philippe Normand
Minister of Public Works
10 July 1920 – 13 July 1920: John Dowsley Reid
13 July 1920 – 29 December 1921: Fleming Blanchard McCurdy
Minister of Railways and Canals 
10 July 1920 – 21 September 1921: John Dowsley Reid
21 September 1921 – 29 December 1921: John Alexander Stewart
Secretary of State of Canada
10 July 1920 – 22 January 1921: Arthur Lewis Sifton
22 January 1921 – 24 January 1921: Vacant (Thomas Mulvey was acting)
24 January 1921 – 21 September 1921: Sir Henry Lumley Drayton (acting)
21 September 1921 – 29 December 1921: Rodolphe Monty
Registrar General of Canada
10 July 1920 – 29 December 1921: The Secretary of State of Canada (Ex officio)
10 July 1920 – 22 January 1921: Arthur Lewis Sifton
22 January 1921 – 24 January 1921: Vacant (Thomas Mulvey was acting)
24 January 1921 – 21 September 1921: Sir Henry Lumley Drayton (acting)
21 September 1921 – 29 December 1921: Rodolphe Monty
Minister of Soldiers' Civil Re-establishment
10 July 1920 – 19 July 1920: Vacant (Norman Frederick Parkinson was acting)
19 July 1920 – 22 September 1921: James Alexander Lougheed (acting)
22 September 1921 – 29 December 1921: Robert James Manion
Solicitor General of Canada
10 July 1920 – 1 October 1921: Hugh Guthrie (acting)
Minister of Trade and Commerce
10 July 1920 – 21 September 1921: George Eulas Foster
21 September 1921 – 29 December 1921: Henry Herbert Stevens
Minister without Portfolio 
13 July 1920 – 29 December 1921: Sir Albert Edward Kemp
13 July 1920 – 29 December 1921: Edgar Keith Spinney
21 September 1921 – 29 December 1921: Edmund James Bristol
26 September 1921 – 29 December 1921: James Robert Wilson

Offices not of the cabinet
Parliamentary Secretary of Soldiers' Civil Re-establishment
10 July 1920 – 29 December 1921: Vacant

Solicitor General of Canada
1 October 1921 – 29 December 1921: Guillaume André Fauteux

References

Succession

11
1920 establishments in Canada
1921 disestablishments in Canada
Cabinets established in 1920
Cabinets disestablished in 1921
Ministries of George V